Ballymurreen, sometimes written Ballymoreen, is an electoral division in County Tipperary in Ireland. 
The code number assigned it by the Central Statistics Office is 22062.

Relationship to the civil parish

At the time of both the 1911 and 2011 censuses, the division was smaller than the civil parish of the same name, containing just three townlands (Curraheen, Parkstown and Liskeveen) of the seven that belong to the civil parish; the  four other townlands from Ballymurreen civil parish belonged to Littleton electoral division.

Statistics

At the time of the 2011 census, the total population of Ballymurreen electoral division was 254, of which 150 were male and 104 female. There were 103 dwellings, of which 10 were vacant.

References

Electoral divisions in County Tipperary